Elizabeth Matilda Tansey  (known as Tilli) is an Emerita Professor of the history of medicine and former neurochemist, best known for her role in the Wellcome Trust's witness seminars. She previously worked at Queen Mary University of London (QMUL).

Education
Tansley was educated at the University of Sheffield where she was awarded a PhD in 1978 for histochemical studies of the brain in cephalopods. After switching fields from neuroscience to the history of science, she was awarded a second PhD in the history of science for her research on the early career of the nobel laureate Henry Hallett Dale.

Career and research
Between 2012 and 2017, she was head of the History of Modern Biomedicine Research Group, on a five-year research project funded by the Wellcome Trust titled The Makers of Modern Biomedicine: Testimonies and Legacy, to record oral testimonies from those who have contributed significantly to modern medical sciences.

Tansey's Witness Seminar series, held at the Wellcome Trust Centre, had the aim of bringing together medical professionals, scientists and technicians in group discussions, with the purpose of learning about significant periods in the history recent medicine. Topics covered have included oral contraceptives, genetic testing, and post-penicillin antibiotics.

Selected publications
 She co-edited a book with Susan Wray celebrating one hundred years of women physiologists.
The History of Toxicology: the Long and Short of it
Rudolf Magnus; Physiologist and Pharmacologist (1873–1927): A Biography concerning Rudolf Magnus

Awards and honours
Tansey is an honorary member of The Physiological Society. In 2015, at the centenary of women's membership of the Physiological Society, Tansey received the Paton prize and presented her prize lecture entitled Maude, Nettie, Ghetel and George, a study of some women married to early nineteenth century Physiological Society members.

In 2017 she was elected an honorary fellow of the Royal Society of Medicine.

References

Further reading 

 

Living people
Academics of Queen Mary University of London
Academics of University College London
Alumni of the University of Sheffield
Fellows of the Academy of Medical Sciences (United Kingdom)
Fellows of the Royal College of Physicians
British medical historians
Neurochemists
Place of birth missing (living people)
Year of birth missing (living people)
Officers of the Order of the British Empire
British women historians
Presidents of the History of Medicine Society